Rattapon Auttawong (born March 12, 1981) is a Thai professional footballer who plays as a midfielder.

External links
 

1981 births
Living people
Rattapon Auttawong
Association football midfielders
Rattapon Auttawong
Rattapon Auttawong
Rattapon Auttawong
Rattapon Auttawong